Abu Yaqub al-Masri, also known as Zakkariya (The Doctor) and labeled "The Emir of Taji", was a member of Al-Qaeda who died on 31 August 2007. He was the organizer of the 23 November 2006 Sadr City bombings.

History

He was thought to be a member of the Egyptian Islamic Jihad and Al-Qaeda, and fought in Afghanistan. He was close to Ayman al-Zawahiri.

Death
The Egyptian-born Masri was killed by Coalition forces near the city of Tarmiya, north of Baghdad.

References

Year of birth missing
2007 deaths
Egyptian al-Qaeda members
Egyptian Islamic Jihad
Members of al-Qaeda in Iraq